Henry Domercant (born December 30, 1980) is an American and Bosnian-Herzegovinian professional basketball coach and former player. He is currently the head coach of the Windy City Bulls in the NBA G League, the development team for the Chicago Bulls of the National Basketball Association. He played college basketball for Eastern Illinois, and was an All-EuroLeague Second Team selection in 2012.

College career
Domercant attended Eastern Illinois, being second in NCAA Division I scoring both in the 2001–02 season averaging 26.4 points as a junior, and again as a senior in 2002–03 with an average of 27.9 per game. He finished with EIU and Ohio Valley Conference records of 2,602 career points in his four college seasons.

Professional career
Domercant was selected in the 2003 Continental Basketball Association (CBA) draft by the Yakima Sun Kings. However, he decided to begin his professional career in Turkey for the 2003–04 season with Pınar Karşıyaka. He moved to Efes Pilsen in 2004 and played two seasons for the club. He departed Turkey following the 2005–06 season and moved to Greece, signing with Olympiacos Piraeus. For the 2007–08 season, he joined Dynamo Moscow.

Between 2008 and 2010, Domercant played in Italy for Montepaschi Siena, winning all three competitions both seasons with the club: Italian Supercup, Italian Cup, and the Italian league championship. For the 2010–11 season, he moved back to Russia where he played for Spartak Saint Petersburg, and then for the 2011–12 season, he continued in Russia playing for UNICS Kazan.

On August 21, 2012, Domercant signed with Galatasaray Liv Hospital. However, in late November, he was ruled out for six months with a knee injury; he appeared in just one game. He returned to Galatasaray for the 2013–14 season, averaging 7.1 points and 1.3 rebounds in 19 league games. He also averaged 4.7 points and 1.2 rebounds in 27 EuroLeague games.

On January 17, 2015, Domercant signed with Juvecaserta Basket of the Italian Lega Basket Serie A. In 12 games for Juvecaserta to finish the 2014–15 season, he averaged 10.9 points and 2.9 rebounds per game.

On February 12, 2016, Domercant was acquired by the Idaho Stampede of the NBA Development League. On February 19, he made his debut for the Stampede in a 99–96 loss to the Grand Rapids Drive, recording three points and one rebound in 11 minutes.

On August 4, 2017, Domercant signed with Romanian club U BT Cluj-Napoca. On August 24, 2017, he parted ways with U BT Cluj-Napoca before appearing in a game for them. Domercant left the team with a foot injury.

National team career
In 2005, Domercant began representing the senior Bosnia and Herzegovina national team. He played with Bosnia and Herzegovina at two major FIBA championships, the EuroBasket 2005 and the EuroBasket 2011.

Coaching career
On October 23, 2017, it was reported that Domercant was hired as an assistant coach by the Maine Red Claws, the Boston Celtics' development team in the NBA G League. 

In 2018, he was hired as an assistant coach for Windy City Bulls, the Chicago Bulls' G League affiliate. In 2020, he was promoted to the role of player development coordinator following the Bulls' hiring of Billy Donovan as head coach and the Windy City Bulls sitting out the 2020–21 season. He was named the head coach of the Windy City Bulls before the 2021–22 season.

EuroLeague career statistics

|-
| style="text-align:left;"| 2004–05
| style="text-align:left;"| Efes Pilsen
| 23 || 23 || 31.7 || .450 || .457 || .786 || 4.1 || 1.4 || 1.6 || .1 || 14.1 || 14.2
|-
| style="text-align:left;"| 2005–06
| style="text-align:left;"| Efes Pilsen
| 22 || 21 || 32.0 || .411 || .356 || .761 || 3.2 || 1.6 || 1.7 || .1 || 12.4 || 11.5
|-
| style="text-align:left;"| 2006–07
| style="text-align:left;"| Olympiacos
| 22 || 11 || 24.4 || .474 || .444 || .711 || 2.1 || .5 || 1.0 || .1 || 11.2 || 8.0
|-
| style="text-align:left;"| 2008–09
| style="text-align:left;"| Montepaschi
| 20 || 15 || 23.6 || .397 || .385 || .943 || 2.4 || 1.4 || 1.0 || .1 || 10.1 || 8.6
|-
| style="text-align:left;"| 2009–10
| style="text-align:left;"| Montepaschi
| 16 || 1 || 17.2 || .478 || .509 || style="background:#CFECEC;"|.938 || 1.5 || .6 || .4 || .1 || 10.5 || 7.1
|-
| style="text-align:left;"| 2011–12
| style="text-align:left;"| UNICS
| 19 || 19 || 31.9 || .433 || .495 || .837 || 3.7 || 1.6 || .6 || .1 || 15.5 || 16.3
|-
| style="text-align:left;"| 2013–14
| style="text-align:left;"| Galatasaray
| 27 || 5 || 13.6 || .333 || .310 || .905 || 1.2 || .4 || .6 || .0 || 4.7 || 2.9
|- class="sortbottom"
| style="text-align:left;"| Career
| style="text-align:left;"|
| 149 || 95 || 24.7 || .419 || .414 || .833 || 2.6 || 1.1 || 1.0 || .1 || 10.9 || 9.5

References

External links
 Henry Domercant at euroleague.net
 Henry Domercant at legabasket.it
 Henry Domercant at tblstat.net

1980 births
Living people
American expatriate basketball people in Greece
American expatriate basketball people in Italy
American expatriate basketball people in Russia
American expatriate basketball people in Turkey
American men's basketball players
Anadolu Efes S.K. players
Basketball coaches from Illinois
Basketball players from Chicago
BC Dynamo Moscow players
BC Spartak Saint Petersburg players
BC UNICS players
Bosnia and Herzegovina basketball coaches
Bosnia and Herzegovina men's basketball players
Bosnia and Herzegovina people of African-American descent
Eastern Illinois Panthers men's basketball players
Galatasaray S.K. (men's basketball) players
Idaho Stampede players
Juvecaserta Basket players
Karşıyaka basketball players
Maine Red Claws coaches
Mens Sana Basket players
Naturalized citizens of Bosnia and Herzegovina
Olympiacos B.C. players
Shooting guards
Sportspeople from Chicago
Windy City Bulls coaches